Roger "Twiggy" Day (born Roger Thomas in Cheltenham, Gloucestershire England; 29 March 1945) is a radio broadcaster and DJ who began his career in offshore radio, and was a key pioneer in commercial radio. He later presented on BBC Local Radio across southern England.

Radio career
In March 1966 Day met Dave Cash who arranged for him to DJ with Radio England, he went live on air in May that year. After Radio England closed down Day joined Radio Caroline and remained with the station even after it was outlawed. In January 1968 his fan club, the Daydreamers Club, was set up and was run by his father Bertie Thomas; by November of that year it had over 2000 members. Also in 1968 he was voted the 10th best national DJ by the readers of Disc and Music Echo with his Caroline show voted as 7th best in the country. In the summer of 1968 he started at Radio Luxembourg. In December 1968 Day compered a number of shows for the Beach Boys during their European tour beginning at the London Palladium. In 1970 he joined Radio North Sea International where he remained for four months. He briefly rejoined Radio Caroline in 1973 and also worked for the United Biscuits Network. On 2 April 1974 Day was the first DJ heard on the morning of the launch of Piccadilly Radio in Manchester.

In 2012 the Roger Day Evening Show, which was broadcast on BBC Local Radio, was nominated for best radio show at the Music Week Awards.

Day then moved stations and until 2012 began presenting a daily show on BBC Radio Kent every weekday evening from 7 to 10pm. The show was heard on six stations (BBC Radio Kent, BBC Sussex, BBC Surrey, BBC Radio Solent, BBC Radio Berkshire and BBC Radio Oxford) in the South and South East of England.

From 2013, Roger Day had a weekly show on BBC Radio Kent, taking over Dave Cash's classic countdown show in 2017 until March 2020, featuring the charts of 1960 to 1979. He continues to do classic charts online. He has also presented an afternoon show on Radio Caroline's Caroline Flashback station online, and a weekday show on Delux Radio.

In February 2021, he was the first voice heard on Boom Radio, where he presents a Monday to Thursday show, Roger Day in the Evening 6-8pm, a two-hour Sixties show on Saturdays at 8.00am.

References

External links 
Personal website
Roger Day in the Evening on Boom Radio
Roger Day on Boom Radio
Roger Day interviewing Albert Scanlon - streaming audio

1945 births
Living people
People from Cheltenham
British radio DJs
British radio personalities
English radio personalities
Pirate radio personalities
Offshore radio broadcasters